Ryan Chiaverini is a Chicago/Midwest Emmy Award-winning television personality, actor, musician, and the co-host of Windy City Weekend, formerly Windy City Live on ABC7 Chicago (WLS-TV) alongside Val Warner. The show initially replaced the "Oprah" time slot in Chicago on WLS-TV. The working title was originally "Morning Rush."  Chiaverini is credited with naming the show Windy City LIVE. For more than a decade, it has been Chicago's premier talk show winning multiple Midwest Emmys and other accolades. The show format relies heavily on the chemistry between Ryan and Val and guests include some of Hollywood's biggest actors, musicians, TV celebrities, along with local entrepreneurs, restaurateurs, and political figures. Ryan has interviewed countless celebrities including Oscar winners Al Pacino, Halle Berry, Jennifer Lawrence, Octavia Spencer, Emma Stone as well as Grammy Winners Ed Sheeran, Garth Brooks, The Jackson 5, and Chaka Khan. Ryan's Emmy nominated "2 Minute Warning" segment has become a fan favorite and wildly popular with the audience. He writes and produces a series of rapid fire questions prompting spontaneous and fun responses from A-list stars. Featured guests include Kevin Hart, Dwayne "The Rock" Johnson, Larry King, Mike Tyson, Will Ferrell, Chance The Rapper, The Jonas Brothers, Diane Sawyer, Susan Lucci, Snoop Dogg etc.

Personal life 
Ryan is the oldest of five brothers including a twin, Darrin Chiaverini (Ryan is 8 minutes older). Both Ryan and Darrin graduated from the University of Colorado Boulder. Ryan was a "walk on" defensive back before earning a full athletic scholarship in 1998. He was a stand out special teams player and played in three Bowl games. Darrin was a team captain (wide receiver) and was drafted by the Cleveland Browns in 1999 and also played for the Dallas Cowboys (2001) and Atlanta Falcons (2002). He is currently a college football coach. Their uncle, Tony Chiaverini, was a professional boxer compiling a record of 39 (26KO's)-9-2. In 1979, he fought Sugar Ray Leonard at Caesars Palace (Chiaverini lost -5th Rd TKO). Howard Cosell was the commentator for the fight.

In 2019, Chiaverini was featured on the cover of Modern Luxury's "Men's Book" magazine "Men of the Year" edition. In 2012, Modern Luxury named Chiaverini among "Chicago's Most Eligible Bachelors" and New City named him "Best Looking Male TV Personality." Ryan attended Corona High School (California) and was senior class president and prom king. Ryan's father, Eddie Chiaverini is a professional musician garnering success in the 1960s with the surf band The Lively Ones. Their hit song "Surf Rider" is featured on the Pulp Fiction movie soundtrack. In 1995, The Lively Ones received a platinum album nearly 30 years after their original recording was released by Del-Fi Records.

Broadcast career 
In 2011, after a nationwide search, Chiaverini was chosen to co-host a new talk show Windy City LIVE on ABC7 Chicago. The audition process included several hundred candidates including Stephen A. Smith, Drew Lachey (98 Degrees), Jon Kelley among others.

Chiaverini began his career at KFBB in Great Falls, Montana, as the weekend sports anchor. He was also a sports producer, writer, and photographer primarily for high school sports and local college athletics. Less than a year later, he accepted a similar position at KTVQ in Billings, MT. In 2002, he was hired to be a sports reporter for KUSA in Denver, Colorado. He spent four seasons covering the Denver Broncos, Colorado Rockies, Denver Nuggets, and Colorado Avalanche. In addition to sports reporting he was a fill in anchor and fill-in host for the Mike Shanahan Show and John Elway's Crush Zone. In 2006, Chiaverini accepted a sports reporter job at WLS-TV in Chicago. He spent five years covering the Chicago Bears, Chicago Bulls, Chicago BlackHawks, Chicago Cubs and Chicago White Sox. In 2010, Chiaverini was promoted to weekend sports anchor at WLS-TV. He also hosted the Chicago Huddle for three seasons, a weekly Chicago Bears TV show. Prior to winning season 9 of American Idol, Chicagoan Lee DeWyze was the show's in-house entertainment at the ESPN Zone in downtown Chicago.

Music 
Ryan Chiaverini is active in the Chicago music scene as a singer/guitarist. In 2019, He released his second single "This is Country" (Spotify) accompanied by a music video on YouTube. In August, 2014 he released his first single "Chicago" on iTunes and YouTube. Cameos by several prominent Chicagoans including Cubs Hall of Famer Ernie Banks appear in the music video. He has also performed with Grammy winners Max Weinberg, Jim Peterik, and Richard Marx at various charity events including "Newsapalooza."

Acting 
in 2021, Ryan Chiaverini was cast as a lawyer in the Lifetime movie Switched Before Birth, directed by Elisabeth Röhm (Law & Order).  He has also appeared in Showtime's hit show Shameless, ABC's General Hospital, and independent films.

Charity 
Ryan is involved with several local charities and philanthropic endeavors. In 2009, his younger brother (by 11 years) Zach died by suicide at the age of 20. In 2015, Ryan shared his loss publicly on Windy City LIVE. He speaks annually at the "Out of the Darkness" walk for The American Foundation for Suicide Prevention. He has held music fundraisers to advocate for mental health awareness and raise money for AFSP. In 2019, Ryan's mother Edna passed at the age of 64 due to complications from cancer. Ryan emcees countless charity events raising money in her memory for several cancer organizations in Chicago. Ryan also volunteers with "A Boy and His Dream" foundation raising money to provide college scholarships for low income and at risk youth.

References

http://windycitylive.com/about/Co-host-Ryan-Chiaverini/8138868
http://www.adrinkwith.com/a-drink-with-ryan-chiaverini/
http://best.newcity.com/2011/12/14/best-looking-male-local-tv-personality/
http://timeoutchicago.com/arts-culture/chicago-media-blog/239395/abc-7-picks-chiaverini-warner-as-oprah-talk-show-replacements
http://sportsillustrated.cnn.com/football/college/rosters/1999/ccn/
http://gpryanchiaveriniabc7.blogspot.com/

External links

Radio personalities from Chicago
1977 births
Living people
University of Colorado Boulder alumni